Mohamad Sahil bin Suhaimi (born 8 July 1992) is a Singaporean professional footballer who plays as a forward for Singapore Premier League side Hougang United and the Singapore national team.

Club career

Young Lions
Sahil Suhaimi made his S.League debut as a 17-year-old against Etoile FC in 2010 as a midfielder and impressed against the more physical French side but National Service restricted further appearances.

Breakthrough
During the 2012 Inaugural Nexlions Cup in December 2012, the then 20-year-old Sahil made appearances for Singapore U23 against Liverpool F.C.'s and Manchester United FC's U23 teams, where he scored the team's only goal in their tournament against United. Despite rumours of Warriors FC scouting Sahil during the tournament, the Courts Young Lions signed Sahil while Warriors FC signed Sufian Anuar from LionsXII instead.

It proved to a breakthrough for Sahil as he impressed after signing for the Courts Young Lions during the football season in 2013. Even during friendlies, Sahil scored in both games against Malaysian giants Johor Darul Takzim who boasted a side with former Italian, Spanish and Malaysian internationals, in both home and away games which ended 1-1 for the Young Lions. Throughout the 2013 S.League season, Sahil impressed with his flair, technical ability, dribbles and his willing attitude to pressure opposing defenders."

LionsXII
Having impressed during the 2014 S.League Season, Sahil was signed up to the LionsXII for the 2015 Malaysian Super League Season. He made his competitive debut as a substitute in the opening game of the season and scored with a brilliantly taken freekick. Sahil then went on to notch a brace in the LionsXII's opening game of the 2015 Malaysia FA Cup, after coming as a half-time substitute, to help the Lions win 4-0 against PB Melayu Kedah and send the Singaporean outfit into the Round of 16. The Lions then went on to win the Malaysia FA Cup in a 3-1 win against Kelantan in the finals, where Sahil had scored the final two goals during the 82nd and 92nd minute. Sahil managed to score 7 goals (4 from the Malaysia FA Cup and 3 in league matches) in 26 appearances for the LionsXII, despite making most of his appearance from the substitute bench.

Geylang International
In December 2015, after the disbandment of LionsXII , he joined Geylang International FC for the 2016 S.League season. He scored his first goal for the Eagles in a 1-1 draw against Brunei DPMM FC.

Tampines Rovers
Sahil has signed for Tampines Rovers for the 2017 but was not registered in the S.League squad, but only for the AFC Cup squad. Sahil also went to Burnley F.C. of the Premier League for a month long training stint.

Sarawak FA
After returning from England, Sahil secured a move to Sarawak FA as one of their foreign players. Playing alongside former Tampines Rovers striker, Mateo Roskam. He make 12 appearances for the malaysian club , scoring two goals in process.

International career
Sahil earned his first international cap against Laos on 10 October 2013, as a substitute in the second half after Singapore national team head coach, Bernd Stange was impressed with Sahil's performance.

2013 Southeast Asian Games
During the 2013 SEA Games, Sahil played a key role as the Singapore U23 team won the Bronze, and finished as joint top scorers in the tournament.

2015 Southeast Asian Games
Sahil was once against selected to play for Singapore U23 in the 2015 Southeast Asian Games. Coach Aide selected him as part of the squad along with stars Irfan Fandi. However, he disappointed throughout the tournament only managing to find the net once against Cambodia in a breakaway, as Singapore were knocked out in the group stages after losing 0-1 to Indonesia and Myanmar 1-2. He had also missed several opportunities notably against The Philippines in a 2-0 win which one of the effort was saved and had 2 shots hit the bar, several slightly over the bar.

Career statistics

Club

. Caps and goals may not be correct.

 Young Lions and LionsXII are ineligible for qualification to AFC competitions in their respective leagues.
Career total excludes LionsXII matches.

International goals 
Scores and results list goal tally first.

U23 International goals 

Statistics accurate as of match played 5 March 2014

Country Honours

International 
Singapore
Southeast Asian Games: 
Bronze Medal: 2013

References

External links
Jakartacasual.blogspot.sg
Goal.com
Todayonline.com
Goal.com
News.asiaone.com

1992 births
Living people
Singaporean footballers
Singapore international footballers
Singapore Premier League players
Singaporean people of Malay descent
Association football forwards
Young Lions FC players
LionsXII players
Footballers at the 2014 Asian Games
Southeast Asian Games bronze medalists for Singapore
Southeast Asian Games medalists in football
Competitors at the 2013 Southeast Asian Games
Asian Games competitors for Singapore